The Preston Public Library is a library in Preston, Minnesota. It is a member of Southeastern Libraries Cooperating, the Southeast Minnesota library region.

References

External links 
 Online Library Catalog
 Southeastern Libraries Cooperating

Southeastern Libraries Cooperating
Buildings and structures in Fillmore County, Minnesota
Education in Fillmore County, Minnesota
Carnegie libraries in Minnesota